Barradeel is a former municipality in the Dutch province of Friesland. It was located north of Harlingen and Franeker, and is now largely a part of Franekeradeel. The municipality existed until 1984.

The municipality included the villages of Firdgum, Klooster-Lidlum, Minnertsga, Oosterbierum, Pietersbierum, Sexbierum, Tzummarum, and Wijnaldum.

Former municipalities of Friesland